Parnassius is a genus of northern circumpolar and montane (alpine and Himalayan) butterflies usually known as Apollos or snow Apollos. They can vary in colour and form significantly based on their altitude. They also exhibit altitudinal melananism, a high-altitude adaptation. They have dark bodies and darker coloring at the base of their wings, which allows them to absorb solar energy more quickly.

Although classified under the swallowtail butterfly family, none of the Parnassius species possesses tails.

The larvae feed on species of plants belonging to the Papaveraceae and Crassulaceae families, and like the other swallowtail butterfly larvae, possess an osmeterium. Unlike most butterflies that have exposed pupae, they pupate inside a loose silken cocoon.

Identification and ecology

Parnassius species of butterflies are often hard to identify and can sometimes only be identified by dissection of the genitalia.
The phylogeny of the group is still under study using molecular techniques. The exact number of species within the genus is disputed and numbers range from 38 to 47.

The Parnassius butterflies also have a peculiar reproductive strategy in that the male has special accessory glands that produce a mating plug that seals the female genitalia after mating. This is believed to ensure the success of the male and to prevent other males from mating and avoids sperm competition.

Butterflies of this genus have been widely used models to study metapopulations, population genetics and gene flow. Their patchy distribution and restricted migration makes them vulnerable to the effects of genetic drift and considerable colour variations can exist in individuals from different regions.

Species
Species include:

Synonymy

Eight subgenera are recognized within the genus:
Driopa Korshunov, 1988 - type species: Papilio mnemosyne Linnaeus, 1758
Sachaia Korshunov, 1988 - type species: Parnassius tenedius Eversmann, 1851
Parnassius Latreille, 1804; Nouv. Dict. Hist. nat. 24 (6): 185, 199 - type species: Papilio apollo Linnaeus
Tadumia Moore [1902]; Lepidoptera Indica, 5 (53): 116 - type species: Papilio acco Gray
Kailasius Moore, [1902]; Lepidoptera Indica, 5 (53): 118 - type species: Parnassius charltonius Gray
Koramius Moore, [1902]; Lepidoptera Indica, 5 (53): 120 - type species: Parnassius delphius Eversmann
Lingamius Bryk, 1935; Das Tierreich 65: 538-540 - type species: Parnassius hardwickii Gray
Eukoramius Bryk, 1935; Das Tierreich 65: 630, 673-674 - type species: Parnassius imperator Oberthür
Other names that are no longer valid include:
Parnassis Hübner, [1819]; Verz. bekannter Schmett. (6): 90 (or misspelled or emended?) - type species: Papilio apollo Linnaeus
Therius Billberg, 1820; Enum. Ins. Mus. Billb.: 75 - type species: Papilio apollo Linnaeus
Doritis Fabricius, 1807; Magazin f. Insektenk. (Illiger) 6: 283 - type species: Papilio apollo Linnaeus

Evolutionary relationships

A molecular phylogenetic study from 2008 suggests firstly that Baronia brevicornis Salvin 1893, rather than belonging to an outgroup Baroniinae belongs to Parnassiini, together with Hypermnestra and Parnassius. Secondly that the earliest split within the genus Parnassius is between subgenus Parnassius (the 'apollo' group, whose caterpillars feed on Crassulaceae, exceptionally Saxifragaceae) and the ancestor of the remaining seven subgenera. The existence of the subgenera is confirmed by molecular phylogenies. Six of the other subgenera have Fumariaceae as the larval food plant, while the larvae of the remaining genus Kreizbergia feed on Scrophulariaceae

Important collections
National Museum of Natural History, Leiden, (Rijksmuseum van Natuurlijke Historie) Curt Eisner collection: Types listed in Eisner, C. Parnassiidae-Typen in der Sammlung J.C.Eisner. Leiden. E.J.Brill, 1966. 190 pp. Col.frontispiece & 84 plts.(Zool. Verh. RMNH, 81). Review of worldwide species of Parnassiidae, 719 taxa included.
Natural History Museum, London: Specimens largely determined by Curt Eisner types listed in Ackery, P. R. (1973): A list of the type-specimens of Parnassius (Lepidoptera: Papilionidae) in the British Museum (Natural History). Bulletin of the British Museum (Natural History) Entomology 29 (1) (9.XI.1973): 1—35, 1 pl.pdf
Ulster Museum, Belfast, H.M Peebles collection: Type list available on CD (Nash, R and Eisner, C.)
Muséum national d'histoire naturelle, Paris: Types listed by Bernardi, G., and Viette, P. 1966. Les types et typoides de Parnassius (s.l.) se trouvant au Museum de Paris. Bulletin de la Société entomologique de France 71 95-103, 163-166. 9 229-233, 304-309.

References

Further reading
Kocman, S. 2009 Parnassius of Tibet and Adjacent Areas Tshikolovets, Kiev  64 col plates, maps, figs 
 Glassberg, Jeffrey Butterflies through Binoculars, The West (2001)
 Guppy, Crispin S. and Shepard, Jon H. Butterflies of British Columbia (2001)
 James, David G. and Nunnallee, David Life Histories of Cascadia Butterflies (2011)
 Pelham, Jonathan Catalogue of the Butterflies of the United States and Canada (2008)
 Pyle, Robert Michael The Butterflies of Cascadia (2002)
Korb, S., 2020 An annotated checklist of the tribus Parnassiini sensu Korshunov of the Old World (Lepidoptera, Papilionidae) Acta Biologica Sibirica ISSN : 2412-1908

External links

 "Genus Parnassius". Insecta.pro.
 Type specimens at ETH
 Images with text in Japanese.
 Photos de Parnassidae
 GloBIS/Gart Checklist 
 GloBIS Database Includes type images
 NSG Genetic (DNA) vouchers
 Genus Parnassius at Butterflies of the Americas Images
 Parnassius of the World Goran Waldeck

 
Butterfly genera
Papilionidae